Minuscule 833 (in the Gregory-Aland numbering), Θε421 (von Soden), is a 14th-century Greek minuscule manuscript of the New Testament on paper. The manuscript has complex contents.

Description 
The codex contains the text of the four Gospels, on 359 paper leaves (size ). The text is written in one column per page, 41 lines per page.

It contains Prolegomena to each Gospel. It contains a commentary of Theophylact.

Text 
The Greek text of the codex is a representative of the Byzantine text-type. Kurt Aland placed it in Category V.

It was not examined by the Claremont Profile Method.

History 

Gregory dated the manuscript to the 14th century. Currently the manuscript is dated by the INTF to the 14th century.

The manuscript was examined by Angelo Maria Bandini. It was added to the list of New Testament manuscripts by Gregory (833e). Gregory saw it in 1886.

Currently the manuscript is housed at the Laurentian Library (Plutei VI. 26), in Florence.

See also 

 List of New Testament minuscules
 Minuscule 832
 Minuscule 834
 Biblical manuscript
 Textual criticism

References

Further reading 

 
 Angelo Bandini, Catalogus codicum manuscriptorum graecorum, latinorum, italicorum etc, Bibliothecae Mediceae Laurentianae (Florence 1767-1778), p. 149-150.

External links 
 Biblioteca Medicea Laurenziana Catalogo Aperto
 Images at the Biblioteca Medicea Laurenziana

Greek New Testament minuscules
14th-century biblical manuscripts